Rodrigo Pinheiro da Silva (born 10 September 1977), known as Rodrigo Batata, is a former Brazilian football player.

Club statistics

References

External links

 (in Japanese)

1977 births
Living people
Brazilian footballers
Brazilian expatriate footballers
J1 League players
Paraná Clube players
Yokohama Flügels players
Portimonense S.C. players
Coritiba Foot Ball Club players
Paulista Futebol Clube players
J. Malucelli Futebol players
Club Puebla players
Expatriate footballers in France
Expatriate footballers in Portugal
Expatriate footballers in Japan
Expatriate footballers in Mexico
Association football midfielders
Footballers from Curitiba